Jharkhand Yuva Morcha (translation: Jharkhand Youth Front) is the youth wing of Jharkhand Mukti Morcha..

Youth wings of political parties in India
Jharkhand Mukti Morcha
1991 establishments in Bihar
Political parties established in 1991